HMS Banshee was one of three s which served with the Royal Navy.

She was launched on 17 November 1894 at the Laird, Son and Co shipyard, Birkenhead, and served most of her time in the Mediterranean. Banshee was sold off in 1912.

Construction and design
HMS Banshee was one of three "twenty-seven knotter" torpedo boat destroyers ordered from Laird, Son and Co on 7 February 1894 as part of the Royal Navy's 1893–1894 construction programme. As a torpedo boat, the planned armament was a single QF 12 pounder 12 cwt ( calibre) gun on a platform on the ship's conning tower (in practice the platform was also used as the ship's bridge), together with a secondary gun armament of three 6-pounder guns, and two 18 inch (450 mm) torpedo tubes. As a gunboat, one of the torpedo tubes could be removed to accommodate a further two six-pounders. Detailed design was left to the builders (although all designs were approved by the Admiralty), resulting in each of the builders producing different designs rather the ships being built to a standard design.

Displacement was  light and  full load. She had a crew of 50 officers and men.

Banshee was laid down at Laird's Birkenhead shipyard on 1 March 1894 as Yard number 598 and was launched on 17 November 1894. She was completed in July 1895.

Service history
On 24 July 1895, Banshee commissioned at Devonport for manoeuvres of the Channel Fleet. In January 1896, Banshee was in commission at Devonport for training purposes. In March 1896, she was docked at Devonport for repair of damage to her hull sustained in severe weather in the Irish Sea. In July 1896, Banshee took part in the Royal Navy's annual fleet exercises. Later that year, she joined the Mediterranean Fleet, arriving at Malta on 16 September. She remained on the Mediterranean station for most of the rest of her service. Lieutenant Alan Cameron Bruce was appointed in command in the Spring of 1902. She visited Lemnos in August 1902, and Argostoli in early October. Lieutenant James Uchtred Farie was appointed in command later that year.

Banshee was sold for scrap to Ward of Briton Ferry on 10 April 1912, for a price of £ 1780.

Notes

Bibliography
 

 

Banshee-class destroyers
Ships built on the River Mersey
1894 ships